Karenga District  is a district in Northern Uganda, in the Karamoja sub-region. The district headquarter is located in Karenga town. It was carved out of Kaabong District and its operations started on July 1, 2019. The district has two constituencies: Dodoth West and Napore West. It borders South Sudan and Kaabong District. The population is 84,100, divided over 7 sub-counties and 3 town councils.

Karenga District is located in the vicinity of Kidepo Valley National Park.

References

Karenga District comprises two Constituencies: Dodoth West and Napore West. It is the home District to the wildest of the African Game Parks, the Kidepo Conservation Area (Kidepo Valley National Park).

Districts of Uganda